Tillandsia rauschii is a species of flowering plant in the genus Tillandsia. This species is endemic to Bolivia.

References

rauschii
Flora of Bolivia